= Anchor Plaza =

Romanian office building

- Interactive map of the Anchor Plaza area

General information
- Status: Completed
- Location: Bucharest, Romania
- Coordinates: 44.430013°N 26.035589°E
- Construction started: 2004
- Opening: 2006
- Owner: Anchor Group

Height
- Roof: 35.6 m (117 ft)

Technical details
- Floor count: 12
- Floor area: 33,000 m^{2} (360,000 sq ft)

Anchor Plaza is an office building located in Bucharest. It has 12 floors and a surface of 33,000 square metres (360,000 sq ft). Tenants include Adobe and Carrefour.
